Datana modesta is a species of moth in the family Notodontidae (the prominents). It was first described by William Beutenmüller in 1890 and it is found in North America.

The MONA or Hodges number for Datana modesta is 7910.

References

Further reading

External links

 

Notodontidae
Articles created by Qbugbot
Moths described in 1890